The 1976–77 Syracuse Orangemen basketball team represented Syracuse University during the 1976–77 NCAA men's basketball season. The team was led by first year head coach Jim Boeheim.

Roster

Schedule and results

|-
!colspan=9 style=| Regular season

|-
!colspan=9 style=| ECAC Tournament

|-
!colspan=9 style=| NCAA Tournament

Rankings

References

Syracuse Orange men's basketball seasons
Syracuse
Syracuse
Syracuse Orangemen Basketball Team
Syracuse Orangemen Basketball Team